Larry Cohen (died 2019) was an American film producer, director, and screenwriter.

Larry Cohen or Lawrence Cohen may also refer to:
 Larry Cohen (bridge) (born 1959, Larry Neil), American bridge player and writer, known for the idea of "The Law of Total Tricks"
 Larry T. Cohen (1943–2016), American bridge player, accused in 1977 of cheating during a trial match for international selection
 Larry Cohen (union leader), president of the Communication Workers of America
 Larry Cohen (soccer) (born 1987), South African professional footballer
 Larry Cohen (musician), American newgrass bass player in Skyline (musical group) and composer
Laurence Jonathan Cohen (1923–2006), British philosopher
Lawrence D. Cohen, American screenwriter, best known for writing Brian De Palma's Carrie (1976)
Lawrence D. Cohen (politician) (1933–2016), American politician